Teja may refer to:

Places
Isla Teja, an island in Chile
La Teja, a neighbourhood of Montevideo, Uruguay
Teja, Perak, Malaysia
Teja Kalan, a village in Batala in Gurdaspur district of Punjab State, India
Teja Khurd, a village in Batala in Gurdaspur district of Punjab State, India
Veela Teja, a village in Batala in Gurdaspur district of Punjab State, India

People
Dwaraka Ravi Teja (born 1987), Indian cricketer
 Hari Teja (born 1989), Telugu actress
Mihai Teja (born 1978), Romanian footballer and manager
Neftalí Teja Cisneros (born 1991), Mexican former professional footballer, known as Neftalí Teja
Ram Charan Teja, Telugu film actor
Ravi Teja (born 1968), an Indian film hero who works mainly in Tollywood
Ravi Teja (cricketer) (born 1994), Indian cricketer
Suddala Ashok Teja (born 1954), Telugu lyricist
Teia or Teja (died 552 or 553), Ostrogothic king in Italy
Teja (film director) (born 1966), Telugu film director
Teja Belak (born 1994), Slovenian artistic gymnast
Teja Černe (born 1984), Slovenian Olympic sailor
Teja Devkar, Marathi TV and film actress
Teja Melink (born 1980), Slovenian pole vaulter
Teja Narla (1996–2013), Telugu film actor
Teja Paku Alam (born 1994), Indonesian footballer
Teja Singh (disambiguation)
Teja Zupan (born 1990), Slovenian Olympic swimmer
Veer Teja, legendary Rajasthani folk hero.

Other uses
Dharma Teja, a 1989 Indian Telugu film directed by Perala and produced by Sainath
Teja (film), a 1992 Telugu thriller film
Teja TV, a Telugu-language Indian television channel
Teja (confectionery), a confectionery from Peru and Spain
Veer Teja (or Tejaji),a Rajasthani folk deity

See also
Tejas (disambiguation)